Senteg is a rural locality (a village) in Kiyaiksky Selsoviet of Zavyalovsky District of the Udmurt Republic, Russia, located  northwest of Izhevsk, the capital city of the republic. The village has a population of 51 (2003 est.). Its dialing code is +7 3412 and its postal code is 427030.

References

Rural localities in Udmurtia